Nishi Trishna (English: Night Thirst) is a Bengali horror film directed by Parimal Bhattacharya. This film was released in 1989 under the banner of S. B. Films Private Limited. It was the first Bengali language vampire movie, starring Prasenjit Chatterjee, Shekhar Chatterjee and Moon Moon Sen.

Plot
Few friends plan to visit the Garchampa Palace in a village. The palace had a bad reputation for demonic blood sucking spirit beings that were terrorising the area. They ultimately solve the mystery, and kill the vampire and his mentor.

Cast
 Prasenjit Chatterjee
 Moon Moon Sen
 Shekhar Chatterjee
 Sumitra Mukherjee
 Alpana Goswami
 Shailen Mukherjee
 Jeeban Guha
 Sumanta Mukherjee
 Manas Mukherjee
 Barnali Mitra

References

External links
 

1989 films
Bengali-language Indian films
Indian horror films
1989 horror films
Indian black-and-white films
Indian vampire films
1980s Bengali-language films